Frank Anderson (23 October 1913 – 6 March 1997) was an Australian rules footballer who played with Carlton in the VFL.

Anderson was born at Glenhuntly and attended school at West Brunswick. He started his career at Brunswick as a forward but later played most of his football in defence. He was a premiership player with Carlton in 1938 and a Victorian interstate representative in 1941. Anderson finished second in Carlton's best and fairest on three separate occasions.

After leaving Carlton he became captain-coach of Preston in the VFA. After a couple of years Anderson took up the coaching role at Cobram Football Club.

References

External links

 

1913 births
1997 deaths
Australian rules footballers from Melbourne
Carlton Football Club players
Carlton Football Club Premiership players
Preston Football Club (VFA) players
Brunswick Football Club players
Preston Football Club (VFA) coaches
One-time VFL/AFL Premiership players
People from Glen Huntly, Victoria